Adja Konteh (born 5 March 1992 in Nantes, France) is a French basketball player who plays for ASPTT Arras in the League féminine de basket, the top women's basketball league in France.

References

French women's basketball players
Sportspeople from Nantes
1992 births
Living people